Marcel Toth (born 14 June 1989) is an Austrian footballer who plays for First Vienna.

References

External links

 

1989 births
Footballers from Vienna
Living people
Austrian footballers
Austria youth international footballers
SV Horn players
First Vienna FC players
Association football midfielders
2. Liga (Austria) players